Allen Hamilton (1798–1864) was a founding father of Fort Wayne in Allen County, Indiana.

Biography 
Hamilton, an Irish emigrant, lived in Lawrenceburg in Dearborn County, Indiana, in 1820, when he married Emerine J. Holman, the daughter of prominent Indiana judge Jesse Lynch Holman. In 1823 the Hamilton family moved to Fort Wayne, where Hamilton was appointed deputy clerk in the U. S. Land Office. Hamilton also served as Allen County sheriff (1824–1826), Fort Wayne's postmaster (1825–1831), and as Allen County auditor, clerk, and recorder (1831–1838).

In the 1820s Hamilton partnered with Cyrus Taber to form Hamilton and Taber, an Indian trading company. The firm prospered as Hamilton won the trust and confidence of many Indians, in particular Chief Jean Baptiste de Richardville of the Miami. In 1834 and 1838 Hamilton was appointed to the U. S. Commission to Negotiate Treaties with the Miami in northern Indiana. In 1840 he served on the Commission to Extinguish Indian Titles in Indiana and was appointed the U. S. Indian agent to the Miami from 1841 to 1845. Hamilton was a Whig delegate to the Indiana Constitutional Convention in 1851 and was elected to the Indiana Senate in 1859, serving one term.

Until his death in 1864 Hamilton remained active in business as president of the Fort Wayne branch of the Indiana State Bank and of the Allen Hamilton National Bank in Fort Wayne. He resided at "Veraestau" and is buried in Lindenwood Cemetery.

In 1861 Hamilton donated land for a baseball field at the corner of Lewis Street and Calhoun Street in Fort Wayne. where the Fort Wayne Kekiongas and other teams practiced and played.

Hamilton was the father of Andrew H. Hamilton, a two-term member of the U.S. House of Representatives. He was the grandfather of author Edith Hamilton, whose books on mythology have become classics, and Alice Hamilton, a pioneer in American industrial medicine and the first woman on the Harvard University medical faculty. His great-grandson, Holman Hamilton, is noteworthy for a two-volume biography of President Zachary Taylor.

Notes

References
 Brice, Wallace. History of Fort Wayne. Fort Wayne, IN: D. W. Jones and Son, 1868.
 Gugin, Linda C., and James E. St. Clair, eds. Justices of the Indiana Supreme Court. Indianapolis, IN: Indiana Historical Society Press, 2010.  WorldCat
 Hamilton, Allen, Papers, 1814–1924. “Collection Guide.” William Henry Smith Memorial Library, Indiana Historical Society, Indianapolis, IN. Retrieved February 6, 2012.

External links
 Hamilton Family Papers, Rare Books and Manuscripts, Indiana State Library

County auditors in the United States
People from Indiana
People from Fort Wayne, Indiana
1798 births
1864 deaths
United States Indian agents
Irish emigrants to the United States (before 1923)
19th-century American politicians
19th-century American businesspeople